Brooke Halvorsen (born ) is a Canadian female volleyball player. She is part of the Canada women's national volleyball team.

She participated in the 2015 FIVB Volleyball World Grand Prix.
On club level she played for University of Calgary in 2015.

References

External links
http://www.godinos.com/roster.aspx?rp_id=1787
http://worldgrandprix.2015.fivb.com/en/preliminary-round-group2/competition/teams/can-canada/players/brooke-halvorsen?id=44768

1990 births
Living people
Canadian women's volleyball players
Place of birth missing (living people)
Calgary Dinos players